KUTQ (102.3 FM) is a radio station licensed to La Verkin, Utah, United States. The station is owned by Redrock Broadcasting, Inc.

KUTQ has been granted a U.S. Federal Communications Commission construction permit to increase ERP to 13,000 watts.

References

External links

UTQ